Gladesville may refer to:

Gladesville, New South Wales, Australia
Gladesville, Georgia, United States
Gladesville, West Virginia, United States

See also
Gladeville, Tennessee